Epidemic of Violence is the second album by American thrash metal band Demolition Hammer. It was released in early 1992 to critical acclaim and is considered a cult classic in the thrash metal and death metal genres.

Epidemic of Violence uses a Michael Whelan painting for its cover artwork: Lovecraft's Nightmare B. The first half of the painting, Lovecraft's Nightmare A, was used for Obituary's Cause of Death.

Reception and legacy 
In 2017, Loudwire placed Epidemic of Violence at number 49 on their "Top 50 Thrash Metal Albums" list. Eduardo Rivadavia noted how Demolition Hammer managed to sustain their thrash metal sound during the rise of grunge, comparing them to other bands in the thrash genre who were going for a more commercial sound. Loudwire also named Epidemic of Violence the best thrash metal album of 1992 and called it a cult classic.

On June 24, 2017, Demolition Hammer performed Epidemic of Violence in its entirety at the Gramercy Theater in New York City in celebration of the album's 25th anniversary.

Track listing

2008 re-release live bonus tracks

Personnel 

Demolition Hammer
 Steve Reynolds – lead vocals, bass
 James Reilly – guitar, backing vocals
 Derek Sykes – guitar, backing vocals
 Vinny Daze – drums, backing vocals

Production
 Produced by Tom Soares and Demolition Hammer
 Mixed by Tom Soares and Demolition Hammer
 Recorded and Engineered by Tom Soares
 Red "Lunchbox" Bortolotti – assistant engineer
 Mastered by Howie Weinberg at Masterdisk, New York

References

External links 
Encyclopaedia Metallum page

1992 albums
Demolition Hammer albums
Century Media Records albums
Albums with cover art by Michael Whelan